The World Trade Center Amsterdam is a commercial center located at the Zuidas in Amsterdam, the Netherlands. It was officially opened in 1985, and renovated between 1998 and 2004. Tower H is the highest building, it has 27 levels and measures . The center is a member of the international World Trade Centers Association.

References

External links

World Trade Center Amsterdam

Commercial buildings completed in 1985
1985 establishments in the Netherlands
Skyscraper office buildings in the Netherlands
Skyscrapers in Amsterdam
Economy of Amsterdam
Amsterdam
Kohn Pedersen Fox buildings
Amsterdam-Zuid
20th-century architecture in the Netherlands